José Nilson dos Santos Silva (born 6 April 1991), simply known as Nilson, is a Brazilian professional footballer who plays as a forward.

Club career
Born in São Paulo, Nilson joined Vasco da Gama's youth setup in 2010, after starting it out at Portuguesa. He made his first team – and Série A – debut for the former on 6 June 2010, starting in a 0–4 away loss against Santos.

After being rarely used by Vasco, Nilson was loaned to Série B sides Criciúma, Paraná and Bragantino, but appeared sparingly for all clubs, and was released in December 2013.

On 28 February 2014, Nilson joined Boa Esporte permanently, but after again being a backup, moved to Icasa on 19 September. With the latter he scored a brace in a 3–1 home win against Náutico on 1 November.

On 16 January 2015, Nilson signed for São Bento. After featuring regularly for the club, he joined Cianorte on 16 April. On 19 May 2015 he was loaned to Santos until the end of the year.

Nilson's spell at Peixe was mainly associated to his ugly late miss in the 2015 Copa do Brasil Final against Palmeiras, where he sent the ball wide as the goal was empty. He was subsequently released by the club, and moved to Ventforet Kofu on 8 January 2016.

On 18 January 2017, Nilson signed for Novorizontino.

In November 2020, Nilson joined Hong Kong Premier League club Pegasus.

Career statistics

Honors
Icasa
Copa Fares Lopes: 2014

Nilson finished the first leg of the 2022/23 Thai League 2 season as leading goal scorer with 10 goals.

References

External links

1991 births
Living people
Footballers from São Paulo
Brazilian footballers
Association football forwards
Campeonato Brasileiro Série A players
Campeonato Brasileiro Série B players
Campeonato Brasileiro Série C players
J1 League players
Hong Kong Premier League players
Brazilian expatriate footballers
Brazilian expatriate sportspeople in Japan
Expatriate footballers in Japan
Brazilian expatriate sportspeople in Bolivia
Expatriate footballers in Bolivia
Brazilian expatriate sportspeople in Hong Kong
Expatriate footballers in Hong Kong
CR Vasco da Gama players
Criciúma Esporte Clube players
Paraná Clube players
Clube Atlético Bragantino players
Boa Esporte Clube players
Associação Desportiva Recreativa e Cultural Icasa players
Esporte Clube São Bento players
Cianorte Futebol Clube players
Santos FC players
Ventforet Kofu players
América Futebol Clube (MG) players
Grêmio Novorizontino players
Bangu Atlético Clube players
Associação Atlética Portuguesa (RJ) players
Associação Atlética Internacional (Limeira) players
Centro Sportivo Alagoano players
Associação Atlética Portuguesa (Santos) players
C.D. Jorge Wilstermann players
TSW Pegasus FC players